

The Schneider ES-59 Arrow is a sailplane designed and manufactured in Adelaide, South Australia in the early 1960s. The Arrow was manufactured with a one-piece wing of 13.23 metres span. It was the first Australian-built sailplane to compete in the World Gliding Championships, 1963 in Argentina.  The Arrow has wood/fabric wings and tail and a wood fuselage. It has a fixed main wheel and a nose skid.

Specifications

See also

References

Bibliography

Sailplane Directory. Schneider. Online. October 7, 2007.
 

1960s Australian sailplanes
Glider aircraft
Aircraft first flown in 1962
Edmund Schneider aircraft